NGC 3258 is an elliptical galaxy in the constellation Antlia. It was discovered on May 2, 1834 by John Herschel.

In 2010, a type Ia supernova was detected within NGC 3258; it was subsequently designated SN 2010hx.

References

Antlia
Elliptical galaxies
3258
18340502
Antlia Cluster
030859